CAV and Cav may refer to:

 Cav., in botany, a designator for plants named by Antonio José Cavanilles
 Cavaliere or Cav., an Italian order of knighthood
 Cavalleria rusticana, an opera often played as a double bill with Pagliacci, and then referred to as the Cav/Pag 
 CAV Murcia 2005, or Club Atlético Voleibol, a Spanish volleyball club
 CAV Thakral Home Entertainment Co, Ltd., a Chinese DVD and CD distributor
 Cardiac allograft vasculopathy, a complication of heart transplantation
 Cazombo Airport (IATA code), in Cazombo, Angola
 Chicken anaemia virus, a virus that affects poultry
 Clarion Municipal Airport (FAA identifier), in Clarion, Iowa
 Colegio Alemán de Valencia, a German international school in Valencia, Spain
 Combat Assault Vehicle, a miniatures wargame
 Compressed-air vehicle, a vehicle powered by an air engine
 Computer Aided Verification, an annual academic computer science conference
 Connected and autonomous vehicle or self-driving car
 Constant air volume, a type of heating, ventilating, and air-conditioning (HVAC) system
 Constant angular velocity, a qualifier for the rated speed of an optical disc drive
 Consumer Affairs Victoria, a government agency in Victoria, Australia
 County Cavan, Ireland, Chapman code
 Curia advisari vult or c.a.v., a Latin legal term meaning "the court wishes to be advised"
 Lucas CAV, former automotive electrical manufacturer based in Britain
 Mark Cavendish, British cyclist
 X-41 Common Aero Vehicle, a classified U.S. military space plane

See also
 CAV-1 (disambiguation)
 CAV2, a human gene
 CAV3 (disambiguation)